Sarsfield Creek is a creek in Timiskaming District in northeastern Ontario, Canada. It is in the James Bay drainage basin and is a right tributary of Woollings Creek.

Course
The creek rises at Little Sarsfield Lake in geographic Bompas Township. It then flows north into Ellis Lake, then into Gould Lake, which straddles the border with geographic Lee Township, then into Sarsfield Lake. It takes in the left tributary Tomwool Creek, turns northeast, and reaches its mouth at Meyers Lake, on Woollings Creek, near the border with Cochrane District.  Woollings Creek flows via the Whiteclay River, the Black River, the Abitibi River and the Moose River to James Bay.

References

Other map sources:

Rivers of Timiskaming District